The 1998 All-Ireland Senior Camogie Championship—known as the Bórd na Gaeilge All-Ireland Senior Camogie Championship for sponsorship reasons—was the high point of the 1998 season and the first All-Ireland Camogie Final to be televised live. The championship was won by Cork who defeated Galway by a four-point margin in the final. The match attracted an attendance of 10,436, a then record for the sport of camogie.

Semi-finals
Newly returned to senior ranks, Tipperary had a surprise 3-11 to 3-10 victory over Kilkenny through goals from Noelle Kennedy, Deirdre Hughes and Eimear McDonnell. They played Galway in the All Ireland semi-final without their star forward, Deirdre Hughes, while Galway played without Sharon Glynn. A long free by Colette Nevin to Anne Forde who scored a goal followed by two Galway points to secure a three-point win. Sinéad O'Callaghan and Irene O'Keeffe scored goals for Cork in their 2-15 to 1-9 victory over Clare in the second semi-final.

Final
Cork chose to play with the strong wind in the first half and Galway succumbed to two well-taken goals in the first half by Irene O'Keeffe, playing in her last inter-county match. The first came after 17 minutes the second came after Sinead O'Callaghan's shot rebounded off the crossbar.

This enabled Cork to build themselves a winning lead and hold on to survive the best challenges Galway offered. Only the impressive scoring form of Nevin kept Galway in touch, leaving them four points down at half time, 2-7 to 0-9. Ian O'Riordan wrote in the Irish Times:
Lynn Dunlea was simply outstanding at full forward, drilling over nine points, six from frees, and proving once again how games can be won or lost with dependable free-takers. Added to that was the firepower of Irene O'Keeffe, whose two goals in the first half had Galway constantly playing catch-up afterwards. Last year’s captain, Linda Mellerick, was once again a marvel at midfield and even though she only once made the scoreboard, she created plenty of scores. Considering Mellerick had planned to retire after last season's victory, you just had to wonder where she continues to get her energy and enthusiasm.”

Jim O'Sullivan, who described Mellerick’s performance as her “her best ever in the red and white” wrote in the Irish Examiner:
This was a victory for grit and determination, a never-say-die attitude that many a male side could copy and an absolute will to win that will set this team apart from all the others. Picture the scene: Cork, who could only manage a four-point (2-7 to 0-9) half time lead after playing with the driving wind and rain, were battling with their backs to the wall and a point in front with four minutes to go, as Galway threw everything at them in search of the winning goal. Yet, the Leesiders found reserves of strength to weather the storm and finish with two match-winning points from Lyn Dunlea to give the county its 19th title, and their second in a row over the westerners.
The double goal scorer O'Keeffe said:
We always thought that there wouldn't be much more in it than a couple of goals. They kept coming at us alright but our back line was very strong and that made a big difference in the end. Winning again against Galway adds a little extra buzz because they're probably our greatest rivals at the moment.

Final stages

References

External links
 Historical reports of All Ireland finals

1998 in camogie
1998